The coat of arms of Sint Maarten consists of a shield with a rising sun and the motto. The shield displays the courthouse in the centre, the border monument to the right, the orange-yellow sage (which is the national flower) to the left. Flying in front of the rising sun is the brown pelican, which is the national bird of Sint Maarten. Under the shield is a ribbon with the Latin motto: Semper pro grediens.

See also
Flag of Sint Maarten
Coat of arms of the Netherlands

References

Sint Maarten
Sint Maarten
Sint Maarten
Sint Maarten
Sint Maarten
Sint Maarten
Sint Maarten